Tshamano Mohau Frederik Phaswana (born July 1944) is a South African businessman, the joint chairman of Mondi since June 2013, chairman of Standard Bank Group and Standard Bank of South Africa, chairman of the South African Institute of International Affairs and non-executive director of Naspers.

Early life
Tshamano Mohau Frederik Phaswana was born in July 1944. Phaswana has bachelor's and master's degrees from University of South Africa (Unisa).

Career
Phaswana has been joint chairman of Mondi since June 2013, chairman of Standard Bank Group and The Standard Bank of South Africa, chairman of the South African Institute of International Affairs and non-executive director of Naspers.

Phaswana is the honorary president of the Cape Town Press Club.

Personal life
Phaswana lives in Belgium.

References

1944 births
Living people
University of South Africa alumni
South African expatriates in Belgium
South African businesspeople